This is a list of male actors from Italy, which generally includes those who have resided in Italy or have largely appeared in Italian film productions. This list includes all actors from :Category:Italian male actors.

Persons are listed alphabetically by surname.

A

Michele Abruzzo (1904–1996)
Stefano Accorsi (born 1971)
Antonio Acqua
Giuseppe Addobbati
Gianni Agus
Antonio Albanese
Giorgio Albertazzi
Gigio Alberti
Guido Alberti
Giampiero Albertini
Aldo, Giovanni & Giacomo
Antonio Allocca
Ernesto Almirante
Luigi Almirante
Roberto Alpi
Tullio Altamura
Gerardo Amato
Claudio Amendola
Ferruccio Amendola
Pino Ammendola
Giuseppe Anatrelli
Felice Andreasi
Oscar Andriani
Enzo Andronico
Nando Angelini
Franco Angrisano
Corrado Annicelli
Gabriele Antonini
Omero Antonutti
Renzo Arbore
Giorgio Ardisson
Lello Arena
Maurizio Arena
Henry Armetta
Andrea Aureli

B

Salvatore Baccaro
Don Backy
Giancarlo Badessi
Carlo Bagno
Silvio Bagolini
Ennio Balbo
Raf Baldassarre
Renato Baldini
Franco Balducci
Gigi Ballista
Ignazio Balsamo
Lino Banfi
Luca Barbareschi
Urbano Barberini
Ciccio Barbi
Guglielmo Barnabò
Gianfranco Barra
Giovanni Barrella
Cesco Baseggio
Rick Battaglia
Gino Bechi
Memo Benassi
Carmelo Bene
Roberto Benigni
Francesco Benigno
Galeazzo Benti
Fabrizio Bentivoglio
Alessandro Benvenuti
Nerio Bernardi
Toni Bertorelli
Calisto Bertramo
Ughetto Bertucci
Enrico Beruschi
Nino Besozzi
Cesare Bettarini
Giorgio Bianchi
Roberto Bianchi
Tino Bianchi
Claudio Bigagli
Oreste Bilancia
Enzo Biliotti
Riccardo Billi
Roberto Bisacco
Peppo Biscarini
Claudio Bisio
Gildo Bocci
Federico Boido
Massimo Boldi
Ugo Bologna
Bombolo
Paolo Bonacelli
Gianni Bonagura
Massimo Bonetti
Mike Bongiorno
Alessio Boni
Mario Bonnard
Luigi Bonos
Alberto Bonucci
Sal Borgese
Gianfabio Bosco, in arte Gian
Giulio Bosetti
Andrea Bosic
Raoul Bova
Franco Bracardi
Giorgio Bracardi
Arturo Bragaglia
Andrea Brambilla, in arte Zuzzurro
Gino Bramieri
Armando Brancia
Rossano Brazzi
Mario Brega
Fabrizio Brienza
Enrico Brignano
Paolo Briguglia
Giulio Brogi
Nando Bruno
Tino Buazzelli
Flavio Bucci
Carlo Buccirosso
Aldo Bufi Landi
Luigi Maria Burruano
Fred Buscaglione
Gino Buzzanca
Lando Buzzanca

C

Jerry Calà
Giulio Calì
Ernesto Calindri
Romano Calò
Carlo Campanini
Stelio Candelli
Enzo Cannavale
Antonio Cantafora
Giorgio Cantarini
Lino Capolicchio
Alberto Capozzi
Pier Paolo Capponi
Vittorio Caprioli
Fabrizio Capucci
Franco Caracciolo
Ida Carloni Talli
Paolo Carlini
Pietro Carloni
Siro Carme
Tullio Carminati
Piero Carnabuci
Francesco Carnelutti
Primo Carnera
Mario Carotenuto
Memmo Carotenuto
Renato Carpentieri
Tino Carraro
Albano Carrisi
Pino Caruso
Antonio Casagrande
Maurizio Casagrande
Salvatore Cascio
Maria Caserini
Tino Caspanello
Claudio Cassinelli
Mario Castellani
Sergio Castellitto
Nino Castelnuovo
Antonio Catania
Luciano Catenacci
Gino Cavalieri
Victor Cavallo
Gianni Cavina
Massimo Ceccherini
Carlo Cecchi
Giuseppe Cederna
Guido Celano
Adriano Celentano
Adolfo Celi
Antonio Centa
Ennio Cerlesi
Enzo Cerusico
Gino Cervi
Ugo Ceseri
Renato Cestiè
Andrea Checchi
Renato Chiantoni
Walter Chiari
Renato Cialente
Giovanni Cianfriglia
Sergio Ciani
Eduardo Ciannelli
Nando Cicero
Antonio Cifariello
Emilio Cigoli
Luigi Cimara
Tano Cimarosa
Bruno Cirino
Natale Cirino
Roberto Citran
Franco Citti
Giancarlo Cobelli
Pino Colizzi
Ernesto Colli
Alberto Collo
Vittorio Congia
Ugo Conti
Franco Coop
Bruno Corazzari
Bruno Corelli
Leonardo Cortese
Romolo Costa
Edoardo Costa
Lorenzo Crespi
Vasco Creti
Erno Crisa
Nino Crisman
Olinto Cristina
Carlo Croccolo
Vincenzo Crocitti
Elio Crovetto
Riccardo Cucciolla
Francesco Cura
Alessandro Cutolo

D

Domiziano Arcangeli
Diego Abatantuono (born 1955)
Ugo D'Alessio
Lucio Dalla
Maurizio D'Ancora
Carlo D'Angelo
Gianfranco D'Angelo
Nino D'Angelo
Cesare Danova
Carlo Dapporto
Massimo Dapporto
Rocco D'Assunta
Ninetto Davoli
Luciano De Ambrosis
Renato De Carmine
Eduardo De Filippo
Luca De Filippo
Luigi De Filippo
Peppino De Filippo
Gianni Dei
Roberto Della Casa
Carlo Delle Piane
Duilio Del Prete
Pupo De Luca
Giorgio De Lullo
Carlo De Mejo
Christian De Sica
Vittorio De Sica
Angelo Dessy
Pietro De Vico
Luigi Diberti
Mauro Di Francesco
Franco Diogene
Gioele Dix
Ignazio Dolce
Arturo Dominici
Giulio Donadio
Maurizio Donadoni
Giulio Donnini
Johnny Dorelli
Mino Doro
Umberto D'Orsi
Attilio Dottesio
Daniele Dublino
Giustino Durano
Checco Durante
Carlo Duse
Eugenio Duse
Vittorio Duse

E

George Eastman
Salvatore Esposito

F

Antonino Faà Di Bruno
Aldo Fabrizi
Armando Falconi
Ugo Fangareggi
Franco Fantasia
Ennio Fantastichini
Cesare Fantoni
Franco Fabrizi
Francesco D'Adda
Ferruccio De Ceresa
Sergio Fantoni
Alberto Farnese
Antonello Fassari
Mario Feliciani
Pino Ferrara
Mario Ferrari
Paolo Ferrari
Maurizio Ferrini
Turi Ferro
Gabriele Ferzetti
Salvatore Ficarra
Enzo Fiermonte
Aurelio Fierro
Nunzio Filogamo
Aldo Fiorelli
Beppe Fiorello
Rosario Fiorello
Fiorenzo Fiorentini
Colin Firth
Dario Fo
Arnoldo Foà
Daniele Formica
Franco Franchi
Armando Francioli
Pippo Franco
Nino Frassica
Leopoldo Fregoli
Giovanni Frezza
Giacomo Furia

G

Giorgio Gaber
Carlo Gaddi
Corrado Gaipa
Michele Gammino
Antonio Gandusio
Enzo Garinei
Gabriel Garko
Gianni Garko
Ivo Garrani
Riccardo Garrone (1926–2016)
Franco Gasparri
Alessandro Gassman
Vittorio Gassman
Lauro Gazzolo
Nando Gazzolo
Giuliano Gemma
Piero Gerlini
Pietro Germi
Sandro Ghiani
Massimo Ghini
Emilio Ghione
Pietro Ghislandi
Fosco Giachetti
Gianfranco Giachetti
Franco Giacobini
Adriano Giannini
Giancarlo Giannini
Fabrizio Gifuni
Beniamino Gigli
Andrea Giordana
Renzo Giovampietro
Enio Girolami
Remo Girone
Massimo Girotti
Aldo Giuffrè
Carlo Giuffrè
Carlo Giustini
Loris Gizzi
Enrico Glori
Gene Gnocchi
Tito Gobbi
Francesco Golisano
Claudio Gora
Gilberto Govi
Raoul Grassilli
Giovanni Grasso
Paolo Graziosi
Ezio Greggio
Beppe Grillo
Orso Maria Guerrini
Marco Guglielmi
Leo Gullotta

H

Alessandro Haber
Paolo Hendel
Roberto Herlitzka
Terence Hill
Carlo Hintermann

I

Angelo Infanti
Ciccio Ingrassia
Flavio Insinna
Franco Interlenghi

L

Gabriele Lavia
Ubaldo Lay
Marco Leonardi
Ignazio Leone
Guido Leontini
Gino Leurini
Philippe Leroy
Enzo Liberti
Alberto Lionello
Oreste Lionello
Daniele Liotti
Giampiero Littera
Little Tony
Luigi Lo Cascio
Guido Lollobrigida
Carlo Lombardi
Germano Longo
Livio Lorenzon
Ray Lovelock
Enrico Lo Verso
Folco Lulli
Piero Lulli
Andy Luotto
Roldano Lupi
Alberto Lupo
Daniele Luttazzi
Lelio Luttazzi
Enrico Luzi

M

Erminio Macario
Valentino Macchi
Aldo Maccione
Stefano Madia
Beniamino Maggio
Dante Maggio
Enzo Maggio
Lamberto Maggiorani
Achille Majeroni
Michele Malaspina
Renato Malavasi
Paolo Malco
Nicola Maldacea
Nino Manfredi
Leonard Mann
Guido Mannari
Ettore Manni
Mario Maranzana
Nino Marchesini
Giulio Marchetti
Nino Marchetti
Saverio Marconi
Renzo Marignano
Peter Martell
Alfredo Martinelli
Marino Masé
Valerio Mastandrea
Leopoldo Mastelloni
Marcello Mastroianni
Maurizio Mattioli
Glauco Mauri
Roberto Mauri
Mario Mazza
Carlo Mazzarella
Piero Mazzarella
Umberto Melnati
Ricky Memphis
Furio Meniconi
Adalberto Maria Merli
Franco Merli
Maurizio Merli
Mario Merola
Marco Messeri
Geronimo Meynier
Vittorio Mezzogiorno
Maurizio Micheli
Carlo Micheluzzi
Armando Migliari
Tomás Milián
Camillo Milli
Achille Millo
Gianni Minervini
Riccardo Miniggio, in arte Ric
Felice Minotti
Tiberio Mitri
Domenico Modugno
Massimo Mollica
Alessandro Momo
Carlo Monni
Renzo Montagnani
Renato Montalbano
Enrico Montesano
Luigi Montini
Gianni Morandi
Nanni Moretti
Gastone Moschin
Silvio Muccino
Francesco Mulé
Tiberio Murgia
Paul Müller
Roberto Murolo
Angelo Musco
Vincenzo Musolino
Tuccio Musumeci
Gianni Musy Glori

N

Piero Natoli
Amedeo Nazzari
Franco Nero
Claudio Nicastro
Guido Nicheli
Maurizio Nichetti
Aldo Nicodemi
Carlo Ninchi
Alighiero Noschese
Guido Notari
Silvio Noto
Nick Novecento
Mario Novelli
Ermete Novelli
Novello Novelli
Francesco Nuti

O

Andrea Occhipinti
Egisto Olivieri
Corrado Olmi
Glauco Onorato
Orazio Orlando
Silvio Orlando
Umberto Orsini

P

Bartolomeo Pagano
Ugo Pagliai
Marcello Pagliero
Eros Pagni
Mimmo Palmara
Renzo Palmer
Giuseppe Pambieri
Giorgio Panariello
Elio Pandolfi
Turi Pandolfini
Paolo Panelli
Corrado Pani
Francesco Paolantoni
Marco Paolini
Nando Paone
Rocco Papaleo
Adriano Pappalardo
Giulio Paradisi
Ruggero Pasquarelli
Giorgio Pasotti
Piero Pastore
Livio Pavanelli
Luigi Pavese
Nino Pavese
Nello Pazzafini
Alfredo Pea
Biagio Pelligra
Vincenzo Peluso
Nico Pepe
Memé Perlini
Franco Pesce
Gastone Pescucci
Mario Petri
Luigi Petrucci
Lorenzo Piani
Tina Pica
Lamberto Picasso
Valentino Picone
Leonardo Pieraccioni
Antonio Pierfederici
Marina Pierro
Luciano Pigozzi
Camillo Pilotto
Ezio Pinza
Carlo Pisacane
Luigi Pistilli
Nicola Pistoia
Mario Pisu
Raffaele Pisu
Michele Placido
Cesare Polacco
Afro Poli
Paolo Poli
Cochi Ponzoni
Giuseppe Porelli
Renato Pozzetto
Giancarlo Prete
Andrea Prodan
Gigi Proietti
Aldo Puglisi
Romano Puppo
Alessandro Preziosi

R

Alberto Rabagliati
Corrado Racca
Umberto Raho
Sergio Raimondi
Ermanno Randi
Salvo Randone
Massimo Ranieri
Renato Rascel
Ivan Rassimov
Isarco Ravaioli
Rolando Ravello
Gigi Reder
Remo Remotti
Tony Renis
Teddy Reno
Franco Ressel
Michele Riccardini
Renzo Ricci
Virgilio Riento
Mariano Rigillo
Adriano Rimoldi
Giuseppe Rinaldi
David Riondino
Roberto Risso
Checco Rissone
Mario Riva
Alfredo Rizzo
Giacomo Rizzo
Gianni Rizzo
Enzo Robutti
Carlo Romano
Andrea Roncato
Giacomo Rondinella
Stelvio Rosi
Gian Paolo Rosmino
Paolo Rossi
Renato Rossini
Giacomo Rossi Stuart
Kim Rossi Stuart
Ermanno Roveri
Sergio Rubini
Sandro Ruffini
Ruggero Ruggeri

S

Antonio Sabàto, Jr.
Umberto Sacripante
Corso Salani
Luciano Salce
Vincenzo Salemme
Enrico Maria Salerno
Antonio Salines
Renato Salvatori
Francesco Salvi
Guido Salvini
Tommaso Salvini
Riccardo Salvino
Gigi Sammarchi
Vittorio Sanipoli
Gino Santercole
Walter Santesso
Mario Santonastaso
Pippo Santonastaso
Jacopo Sarno
Paolo Sassanelli
Ugo Sasso
Stefano Satta Flores
Gigi Savoia
Giancarlo Sbragia
Mattia Sbragia
Mario Scaccia
Franco Scandurra
Renato Scarpa
Giulio Scarpati
Eduardo Scarpetta
Filippo Scelzo
Tito Schipa
Tino Schirinzi
Bruno Scipioni
Tino Scotti
Massimo Serato
Gustavo Serena
Jacques Sernas
Domenico Serra
Luigi Serventi
Toni Servillo
Rocco Siffredi
Mario Siletti
Franco Silva
Aldo Silvani
Guglielmo Sinaz
Vinicio Sofia
Gianni Solaro
Emilio Solfrizzi
Paolo Solvay
Alberto Sordi
Alberto Sorrentino
Odoardo Spadaro
Umberto Spadaro
Erminio Spalla
Ignazio Spalla
Bud Spencer
Tony Sperandeo
Franco Sportelli
Luca Sportelli
Carletto Sposito
Ivano Staccioli
Enzo Stajola
Sylvester Stallone
Pippo Starnazza
Benito Stefanelli
Anthony Steffen
Elio Steiner
Luciano Stella
Paolo Stoppa

T

Ferruccio Tagliavini
Luciano Tajoli
Vincenzo Talarico
Alberto Talegalli
Carlo Tamberlani
Nando Tamberlani
Carlo Taranto
Nino Taranto
Gianrico Tedeschi
Teo Teocoli
Gianfranco Terrin
Dante Testa
Eugenio Testa
Nino Terzo
Fabio Testi
Aroldo Tieri
Gabriele Tinti
Giorgio Tirabassi
Sergio Tofano
Lino Toffolo
Achille Togliani
Gianmarco Tognazzi
Ricky Tognazzi
Ugo Tognazzi
Fausto Tommei
Edoardo Toniolo
Pietro Tordi
Luigi Tosi
Otello Toso
Totò
Fausto Tozzi
Fabio Traversa
Leopoldo Trieste
Amedeo Trilli
Massimo Troisi
Marco Tulli
Gualtiero Tumiati
Enzo Turco

U

Toni Ucci
Claudio Undari
Saro Urzì

V

Osvaldo Valenti
Rudolph Valentino
Romolo Valli
Raf Vallone
Massimo Vanni
Luigi Vannucchi
Raimondo Van Riel
Alfredo Varelli
Daniele Vargas
Vittorio Vaser
Venantino Venantini
Milo Ventimiglia
Lino Ventura
Massimo Venturiello
Carlo Verdone
Raimondo Vianello
Enrico Viarisio
Marco Vicario
Piero Vida
Domenico Viglione Borghese
Claudio Villa 
Roberto Villa
Paolo Villaggio
Nino Vingelli
Gino Viotti
Alvaro Vitali
Fabio Volo
Gian Maria Volonté
Franco Volpi

W

Massimo Wertmüller

Z

Ermete Zacconi
Gero Zambuto
Elio Zamuto
Bruno Zanin
Luca Zingaretti
Cesare Zoppetti

See also

Lists of actors
List of Italians

Italy
Male
Actors
Italian